Mohammad Sina Vahedi (born 8 January 2001) is an Iranian basketball player for Mahram Tehran and the Iranian national team.

He represented Iran at the 2020 Summer Olympics.

References

External links

2001 births
Living people
Basketball players at the 2020 Summer Olympics
Iranian men's basketball players
Guards (basketball)
Olympic basketball players of Iran
Sportspeople from Tehran